Occithrissops is an extinct genus of prehistoric ray-finned fish of the Jurassic, described from Sundance Formation. The genus name of Occithrissops refers to the occidental occurrence of the genus and its relationship to Thrissops.

Description
Although it is placed within Ichthyodectiformes, it have some different characters compared to other Jurassic ichthyodectiform Thrissops and Allothrissops, and original description described this taxon as Ichthyodectiformes incertae sedis. Later study considered this taxon is basal ichthyodectiform, and shared some morphological similarities with Jinjuichthys.

See also

 Prehistoric fish
 List of prehistoric bony fish

References

Prehistoric ray-finned fish genera
Jurassic fish of Europe
Ichthyodectiformes